The 2010 Qatar Open, known as the 2010 Qatar ExxonMobil Open for sponsorship reasons, was a men's tennis tournament played on outdoor hard courts. It was the 18th edition of the Qatar ExxonMobil Open, and part of the ATP World Tour 250 series of the 2010 ATP World Tour. It took place at the Khalifa International Tennis Complex in Doha, Qatar, from 4 January through 9 January 2010. Third-seeded Nikolay Davydenko won the singles title.

Finals

Singles

 Nikolay Davydenko defeated  Rafael Nadal, 0–6, 7–6(10–8), 6–4
It was Davydenko's first title of the year and 20th overall.

Doubles

 Guillermo García-López /  Albert Montañés defeated  František Čermák /  Michal Mertiňák, 6–4, 7–5

Entrants

Seeds

Other entrants
The following players received wildcards into the singles main draw:
  Younes El Aynaoui
  Abdulla Hajji
  Karim Maamoun

The following players received entry from the qualifying draw:
  Benjamin Becker
  Steve Darcis
  Ryler DeHeart
  Mikhail Kukushkin

References

External links
 Official website
 ATP tournament information
 ITF tournament edition details